Gaurav Dagaonkar Indian Entrepreneur and the founder and Chief Executive Officer (CEO) at Songfest. He is also known as a popular music director, songwriter and singer. As a music director, Gaurav's first release was the movie Lanka, which released on 9 December 2011. As a business executive, Gaurav turned his passion for music by starting Songfest, one of India's premier artiste labels.

As music director

Gaurav composed an item number called Kaafirana in the film "Joker", directed by Shirish Kunder, starring Akshay Kumar and Sonakshi Sinha. The song was sung by Sunidhi Chauhan and picturized on Chitrangada Singh. The lyrics of the song were changed from "I Want Fakht You" to "I Want Just You", as the former was deemed objectionable by the censor board. Amongst other songs composed by Gaurav has been the song 'Soniye' from the film Will You Marry Me. The song has been sung by Pakistani singer Rahat Fateh Ali Khan as has been written by lyricist Shabbir Ahmed. Gaurav has also featured in the music video of the remix of 'Soniye', alongside Bollywood actors Rajeev Khandelwal, Shreyas Talpade and Mugdha Godse.

Synchronicity

Gaurav is the lead vocalist and frontman of the group 'Synchronicity'. Synchronicity is also the name of the series started by Gaurav in which he performs mash-ups of popular Bollywood, Nepali and Western songs. The first mashup to be recorded and shot as a music video in this series was Tujhe Bhula Diya / Hello. The video has had over 500,000 hits on YouTube. Subsequently, two more tracks, Yara Sili Sili / Careless Whisper and Pee Loon / You Sang To Me were released to a great response. With several requests to perform live, Gaurav and the musicians involved, got together to form the band Synchronicity. Gaurav and Arunima Bhattacharya are the permanent singers in the group, while guest singers in live shows include names like Neeti Mohan, Shalmali Kholgade, Rahul Saxena, Natalie De Luccio, Ustad Sawan Khan, Thomson Andrews and Vidhi Sharma. He also released synchronized tracks with Nepali and Bollywood songs.

As a performing artiste

As a live performer, Gaurav plays with a four-piece band and has performed at some of the biggest festivals in India such as Mood Indigo (IIT Bombay), Chaos (IIM Ahmedabad), Backwaters (IIM Kozhikode). He has shared the stage with renowned artists and bands from India and Pakistan such as Junoon, Silk Route, Mohit Chauhan, Parikrama, Rahul Sharma, etc. He is one of the official brand ambassadors of Gibson guitars in India.
Gaurav has been featured amongst the "Faces of the Future" by India Today (Simply Mumbai, January '09).

Discography

As a solo artiste

Filmography

As a music director

References

External links
 Website https://gauravdagaonkar.com/
 Gaurav refuses job offers to choose music – https://web.archive.org/web/20120216081244/http://inhome.rediff.com/cms/print.jsp?docpath=%2F%2Fmoney%2F2006%2Fapr%2F01iim.htm
 Narayana Murthy releases Gaurav's demo – 
 Gaurav releases his album – http://photogallery.indiatimes.com/articleshow/2752731.cms
 Gaurav on Indiatimes: http://photogallery.indiatimes.com/articleshow/2759382.cms
 Gaurav in the "Times of India" – http://articles.timesofindia.indiatimes.com/2006-12-17/india/27827173_1_iim-a-grad-iim-campus-management-ahmedabad 
 Gaurav named in Faces of the Future – http://indiatoday.digitaltoday.in/index.php?option=com_content&task=view&id=25296&Itemid=1&issueid=89&sectionid=20&secid=34&limit=1&limitstart=3
 Gaurav in Westside Plus, TOI – http://www.mumbaipluses.com/santacruzplus/index.aspx?page=article&sectid=3&contentid=200802292008030316282966e77f5bbe&sectxslt=&comments=true&pageno=1
 Sonu Nigam sings for 'Joker' – http://sonuniigaamandviviek.blogspot.com/2010/01/sonu-niigaam-ji-records-two-songs-in.html
 Gaurav on 'Eventfaqs' – https://web.archive.org/web/20130922112646/http://ec.eventfaqs.com/gauravdagaonkar/profile/4f772736-5029-4c06-ba95-f73f9ffdc0aa.pdf
 Gaurav on 'Box office Capsule' – http://www.boxofficecapsule.com/news-specific.aspx?news_id=673
 Gaurav in 'Hindustan Times' – 

Living people
Indian male singer-songwriters
Indian singer-songwriters
Nepali-language singers from India
1982 births
Singers from Mumbai